Alexander Wills Ogilvy (26 December 1901 – 18 November 1984) was an Australian rules footballer who played for the Melbourne Football Club in the Victorian Football League (VFL).

Notes

External links 

 
Alex Ogilvy on Demonwiki

1901 births
1984 deaths
Australian rules footballers from Victoria (Australia)
Melbourne Football Club players
Scottish emigrants to Australia
Sportspeople from Edinburgh
Scottish players of Australian rules football
VFL/AFL players born outside Australia